The Ministry of Tourism & Antiquities is the Egyptian government organization which serves to protect and preserve the heritage and ancient history of Egypt. In December 2019 it was merged into the Ministry of Tourism with Khaled al-Anani retaining his function.

History
It was formed from the Supreme Council of Antiquities in 2011 during the  presidency  of Hosni Mubarak to deal with the security and theft of Egyptian antiquities.

Grave robbers have been looting ancient Egyptian tombs nearly continuously for well over 4 thousand years. The Ministry of Antiquities works to get the items restored back to Egypt, whenever possible. Over the years, thousands of stolen antiquities have made their way back to Egypt. For instance, in late 2016, the ministry recovered and repatriated two of four Islamic era lamps which had been stolen in 2015. In 2018, a carving in the shape of Osiris which had been hidden in furniture and shipped to Kuwait was repatriated to Egypt's Ministry of Antiquities.

Projects
From 2009 to 2014, the ministry worked with the Getty Conservation Institute on the management and conservation of the tomb of Tutankhamun.

Past ministers
 Zahi Hawass 31 January 2011 – 3 March 2011
 Mamdouh Eldamaty from June 2014
 Khaled al-Anani from 23 March 2016

Duties and goals
In 2016, the minister, Khaled El-Anany, stated his primary focus would be on solving the budget deficit of the ministry, given that many projects were stalled for lack of funding.

See also

 Cabinet of Egypt
 Comité de Conservation des Monuments de l'Art Arabe

References

External links
 Ministry of Tourism and Antiquities' Official website
 Ministry of Tourism and Antiquities on Facebook
 Egypt's Cabinet Database

Antiquities
Egypt
Egypt
Egypt